The Kankélaba River is a tributary of the Bagoé River in western Africa. It flows through northwestern Côte d'Ivoire and southern Mali and forms part of the international boundary between the two states. In southern Mali it flows into the Bagoé River.

References 

Rivers of Ivory Coast
Rivers of Mali
International rivers of Africa
Tributaries of the Niger River
Ivory Coast–Mali border